Herman Densmore "Denny" Shute (October 25, 1904 – May 13, 1974) was an American professional golfer who won three major championships in the 1930s.

Life and career
Born in Cleveland, Ohio, Shute was the son of a golf pro from England; Hermon emigrated to the United States to work as the assistant professional at the Euclid Club. Shute was raised in West Virginia and Ohio and attended Western Reserve University (now Case Western Reserve University) in Cleveland, and was a member of Phi Gamma Delta. He was married on March 20, 1930 to Hettie Marie Potts,  and they had one child, a daughter, Nancy Paige.

Shute won the Open Championship at St Andrews in 1933 in a playoff and the 1936 and 1937 PGA Championships, then conducted at match play. He was the last man to win consecutive PGA Championships before Tiger Woods did so in 1999 and 2000.

Shute was a member of the U.S. team in the Ryder Cup on three occasions: 1931, 1933, and 1937. In 1933, he missed a putt to tie the competition.

Shute died at age 69 at his home in Akron, Ohio. He was elected to the World Golf Hall of Fame in the veterans category in 2008.

Professional wins

PGA Tour wins (16)
1929 (1) Ohio Open
1930 (3) Los Angeles Open, Texas Open, Ohio Open
1931 (1) Ohio Open
1932 (2) Glens Falls Open, Miami Biltmore Open
1933 (2) Gasparilla Open, British Open
1934 (3) Gasparilla Open-Tampa, Riverdale Open, Miami International Four-Ball (with Al Espinosa)
1936 (2) Tropical Open, PGA Championship
1937 (1) PGA Championship
1939 (1) Glens Falls Open

Major championships are shown in bold.

Other wins
this list may be incomplete
1950 Ohio Open

Major championships

Wins (3)

Note: The PGA Championship was match play until 1958
1 Defeated Craig Wood in a 36-hole playoff:  Shute 75-74=149; Wood 78-76=154.

Results timeline

NYF = tournament not yet founded
NT = no tournament
WD = withdrew
DNQ = did not qualify for match play portion 
CUT = missed the half-way cut (3rd round cut in 1958 PGA Championship)
R64, R32, R16, QF, SF = Round in which player lost in PGA Championship match play
"T" indicates a tie for a place

Summary

Most consecutive cuts made – 26 (1926 U.S. Open – 1937 PGA)
Longest streak of top-10s – 4 (1934 PGA – 1935 PGA)

References

External links

American male golfers
PGA Tour golfers
Ryder Cup competitors for the United States
Winners of men's major golf championships
World Golf Hall of Fame inductees
Golfers from Cleveland
Case Western Reserve University alumni
American people of English descent
Sportspeople from Akron, Ohio
1904 births
1974 deaths